Fulvoclysia albertii is a species of moth of the family Tortricidae. It is found in the north-western Caucasus in Russia.

References

Moths described in 1983
Cochylini